Manila is the capital of the Philippines. 

Manila, Maynila, and Maynilad may also refer to:

Places

Philippines
 Metro Manila, the metropolitan area centered on Manila and the National Capital Region of the Philippines
 Mega Manila, a megalopolis which includes Metro Manila and neighboring provinces
 Manila (province), a defunct province that existed during the Spanish colonial period
 Legislative districts of Manila, electoral divisions in Manila used to assign seats in various legislatures
 Greater Manila Area, a contiguous urbanization surrounding Metro Manila
 City of Greater Manila, a defunct chartered city during World War II
 Rajahnate of Maynila, a polity located at Manila in the 16th century

United States
 Manila, Alabama
 Manila, Arizona
 Manila, Arkansas
 Manila, California
 Manila, Kentucky
 Manila, Missouri
 Manila, Utah
 Manila, West Virginia

Hardware and software
Manila, a Sempron processor core
Manila, the codename for TouchFLO 3D, a user interface for Windows Mobile developed by HTC Corporation

Media

Film
 Manila (2009 film), a 2009 film
 The Claws of Light, a 1975 film also known as Manila
 Metro Manila (film), a 2013 film

Television
 Maynila (TV series), Filipino television series on GMA Network

Music
 Manila (album), by Paul Kelly
 "Manila" (Hotdogs song)
 Manila Sound, a genre of music
 "Manila" a 2021 song by Ray Dalton and Álvaro Soler

Games
Manila (board game)
A variant of community card poker

Other
 Gabriel Janer Manila (born 1940), Spanish writer
 Manila Luzon, a drag performer best known for being a contestant on RuPaul's Drag Race
 Manila (horse), an American Thoroughbred racehorse
Manila hemp refers to the natural fibre from the abacá plant that is used in making:
Manila ropes
Manila paper
Manila folders and envelopes
Manila shawl, a fashion accessory
Maynilad Water Services

See also
 Manilla (disambiguation)